Han Xu (born 21 April 1988) is a Chinese football player who currently plays for China League One side Nanjing City.

Club career
In 2006, Han Xu started his professional footballer career with Harbin Yiteng in the China League Two division. Han would be part of the team that gained promotion to the top tier of Chinese football. He would eventually make his Chinese Super League debut for Harbin on 7 March 2014 in a game against Shandong Luneng Taishan, coming on as a substitute for Dorielton in the 83rd minute in game that ended in a 1–0 defeat. The club would be relegated from the top tier at the end of the season after finishing bottom of the league.

On 6 January 2016, Han transferred to his hometown club China League One side Dalian Transcendence. After immediately establishing himself as an integral member of their team in February 2017, Han transferred to fellow China League One club Dalian Yifang. He would go on to win the 2017 China League One division with the club.

On 28 February 2018, Han transferred to Meixian Techand.

Career statistics 
Statistics accurate as of match played 31 December 2020.

Honours

Club
Harbin Yiteng
China League Two: 2011

Dalian Yifang
China League One: 2017

References

External links
 

1988 births
Living people
Chinese footballers
Footballers from Dalian
Zhejiang Yiteng F.C. players
Dalian Transcendence F.C. players
Dalian Professional F.C. players
Guangdong South China Tiger F.C. players
Chinese Super League players
China League One players
Association football midfielders